Copelatus stavropolitanus is a species of diving beetle. It is part of the subfamily Copelatinae in the family Dytiscidae. It was described by Riha in 1974.

References

stavropolitanus
Beetles described in 1974